Pramila Rijal (born 1 May 1985 in Chisapani) is a Nepalese track and field athlete who represented Nepal at the 2012 Summer Olympics in the women's 100 metres. She also competed at the 2009 Asian Athletics Championships, running in the heats of the 200 metres and 400 metres.

References

External links
 

1985 births
Living people
People from Banke District
Nepalese female sprinters
Athletes (track and field) at the 2012 Summer Olympics
Olympic athletes of Nepal
Olympic female sprinters
21st-century Nepalese women